Four Jacks and a Jill is a South African folk rock ensemble.

Career
They originally formed in 1964 without a "Jill" under the name "The Nevadas". Subsequently, they became the first group in South Africa to wear their hair long and they changed their name to "The Zombies" (different from the well-known British group). Later they added lead singer Glenys Lynne and changed the group's name to "Four Jacks and A Jill". The group included Clive Harding (bass guitar), Keith Andrews (rhythm guitar and organ), replaced by the late Mark Poulos (guitar and organ) during 1966–1967 and subsequently Till Hanneman who joined in 1967 (rhythm guitar, organ and trumpet), Bruce Bark (lead guitar, harmonica and saxophone), Tony Hughes (drums) and Glenys Lynne (lead vocal and organ). In South Africa, they had a hit song, "Timothy". In 1968 they cracked the American charts with the song "Master Jack", hitting the Billboard Hot 100 at no. 18 and reaching no. 3 on the Adult Contemporary chart. The song also reached no. 10 on Cashbox and went to no. 1 in South Africa, Canada, Australia, New Zealand, Malaysia, and Rhodesia (now Zimbabwe). The follow-up single, "Mr. Nico", peaked at no. 98 in the United States. That was their last hit in the U.S., but the group continued to score hits in their native country.

They have recorded and produced albums for a range of sing-along educational story books for various South African charities.

Members

Bass Guitar:
Clive Harding (1965 – 1983) *Original Member

Lead Vocals:
Glenys Lynne Mynott/Harding - Lead Vocals (1965 – 1983) *Original Member

Drums:
Tony Hughes/Rouse (1965 – 1982) *Original Member
Mossie Christopher Hills (1982 – 1983)

Guitar:
Bruce Bark (1965 – 1969) *Original Member
Marc Paulos (1966 – 1967)
Till Hannemann (1967 – 1969)
Pierre van Riel (1969 – 1978)
Keith Lansom (1969 – 1971)
Josh Sklair (1973 – 1976)
Paul De Villiers (1973)
John Emmott (1976 – 1977)
Nigel Surtees (1977)
Paul Nissen (1978 – 1980)
John Ferrier (1980 – 1983)
Len Dippenaar (1980 – 1983)

Trumpet:
Keith Andrews (1965 – 1966) *Original Member

Piano:
Cedric Hornby (1971 – 1973)
Mike Nettmann (1973 – 1975)

Keyboard:
Brian Rubenstein (1975 – 1976)
Neill Pienaar (1976 – 1980)
Glynn Storm (1976)

Discography

Albums

Singles

Special Releases

Gospel Albums
A Time For Giving Volume 1 (Jill Music Publishers, 2004)
A Time For Giving Volume 2 (Jill Music Publishers, 2004)
A Time Of Faith Volume 1 (Jill Music Publishers)
A Time Of Faith Volume 2 (Jill Music Publishers)

Supporting Animal Anti-Cruelty League
The Adventures of Tony and Friends - Volume 1 (Jill Music Publishers, 2004)
The Adventures of Tony and Friends - Volume 2 (Jill Music Publishers, 2004)
The Adventures of Tony and Friends - Volume 3 (Jill Music Publishers, 2004)
The Adventures of Tony and Friends - Volume 4 (Jill Music Publishers, 2009)
The Adventures of Tony and Friends - Volume 5 (Jill Music Publishers, 2011)

Supporting Institute for the Blind
The Adventures of Angel and Friends - Volume 1 (Jill Music Publishers, 2004)
The Adventures of Angel and Friends - Volume 2 (Jill Music Publishers, 2006)

Supporting National St Giles Association
The Adventures of Peter and Friends - Volume 1 (Jill Music Publishers, 2004)
The Adventures of Peter and Friends - Volume 2 (Jill Music Publishers, 2009)

Supporting National Council for Persons with Disabilities
On Tour with The New Jeans - Volume 1 (2011)
On Tour with The New Jeans - Volume 2 (2012)

Instrumental Albums
An African Tapestry (2007)
Music to Drive By (2008)
Ornaments of the Sky (2008)
Escape to Africa (2009)
Birds in Song (2010)
An African Farm (2011)
An African Safari (2011)
Seasons (2013)
Oceans (2013)

In popular culture
In the mockumentary film This is Spinal Tap, the character Lt. Robert Hookstratten recommends Four Jacks and a Jill to the members of Spinal Tap.

References

External links
Official website

South African rock music groups
Folk rock groups
Musical groups established in 1964